Days of Jesse James is a 1939 American Western film directed by Joseph Kane and starring Roy Rogers.

Cast
Roy Rogers as Roy Rogers
George 'Gabby' Hayes as Gabby Whittaker
Don 'Red' Barry as Jesse James
Pauline Moore as Mary Whittaker
Harry Woods as Captain Worthington
Arthur Loft as Sam Wyatt
Wade Boteler as Dr. R.S. Samuels
Ethel Wales as Mrs. Martha Samuels
Scotty Beckett as Buster Samuels
Harry J. Worth as Frank James
Glenn Strange as Cole Younger
Olin Howland as Muncie Undersheriff
Monte Blue as Train Passenger
Jack Rockwell as Thompson McDaniels
Fred Burns as Muncie Sheriff
Dorothy Sebastian as Zerilda James

Soundtrack
Roy Rogers - "I'm a Son of a Cowboy" (Music and lyrics by Peter Tinturin)
Roy Rogers - "Saddle Your Dreams" (Music and lyrics by Peter Tinturin)
Roy Rogers - "Echo Mountain" (Music and lyrics by Peter Tinturin)

External links

1939 films
1939 Western (genre) films
American Western (genre) films
Biographical films about Jesse James
American black-and-white films
Republic Pictures films
Films scored by William Lava
Films directed by Joseph Kane
1930s English-language films
1930s American films